"Used to Love" is a song by Dutch DJ Martin Garrix and Australian singer Dean Lewis. It was released on 31 October 2019, through Garrix's Netherlands-based record label Stmpd Rcrds, and exclusively licensed to Epic Amsterdam, a division of Sony Music. The remixes pack was released on 20 December 2019 and an acoustic version on 14 February 2020.

The song was nominated for Most Performed Australian Work and Most Performed Dance Work at the APRA Music Awards of 2021

Background 
In May 2019, when Garrix injured his ankle, his doctors ordered him to take two weeks off before resuming his tour.
After his surgery, his friend and co-producer Albin Nedler visited him at the hospital. At that time the DJ confessed to him that he was writing the song from afar with Dean Lewis. A few days later, the singer came to Amsterdam, Netherlands to finish writing it and start recording it. When he arrived on 17 June, Garrix and Lewis shared their meeting with their fans by posting a photo of themselves on Instagram. It showed them in a short boat hanging out by the water canals in Amsterdam and was accompanied by the comment "I live for days like this!" left by Garrix. In the studio, Lewis played the role of singer and guitarist. He had just finished a long tour that injured his voice, which led him to save it for the second day of recordings and start by recording his guitar parts. He later claimed that the chorus of "Used to Love" is one of the highest vocal lines and that the single is one of the most challenging ones he has worked on. When he recorded his vocals he was led to make several attempts to get the right vocal balance and the right notes without forcing his voice. During the following months, both artists were busy creating new music in Garrix's studio based in Amsterdam. Then, from 7 to 8 September was taking place Garrix's fifth anniversary of Lollapalooza Berlin. It was at this time that the DJ officially revealed that the song was set to be released at the end of October. To accompany his announcement, he added, "This track was made during my break while I was recovering from my ankle injury. Dean and I are super excited to share it with the world!" On 25 October, he posted via his social media the cover of the song, unveiling its release date. After the release, Dean Lewis talked about his collaboration, saying:

Garrix felt it was amazing to make the song with Lewis, who he considers as "a good friend and an exciting talent". He added that the singer wrote deeply personal lyrics accompanied by a timeless style of music during the development of the track.

Critical reception 
Katie Bain of Billboard wrote that Garrix and Lewis paid homage to American singer Bruce Springsteen with the lyrics "we had Springsteen playing so loud" in their track. She felt the song swelling and compelling "in the same style as many of Springsteen's biggest and most grandiose hits", noting that "Lewis' soaring vocals add to the effect" and that "all these elements making yet another bonafide smash from the EDM hitmaker". Writing for Dancing Astronaut, Farrell Sweeney noted the presence of "an energy-building violin line and acoustic elements" resulting from a song "vocal-led by Lewis's impassioned vocals, while Garrix foregoes a heavy electronic emphasis, trading it in for a subtle production backdrop accented with acoustics". Mike Wass of Idolator deemed the song "an emotional banger" and "a duo's genre-blurring bop", containing Dean Lewis vocals "over piano keys and strummed guitar". Writing for Your EDM, Matthew Meadow said that the track is "usual Garrix fare, with some quaint vocal chops in the drop and a non-intrusive melody". According to him, the singer voice "never really stands out from the production, which itself never really reaches any sort of crescendo". He also spotted similarities with Martin Garrix previous songs, such as "No Sleep" or "There for You", but noted that "Used to Love" showed off "a more mellow side to his sound, rather than the firework-inducing main stage bangers most people know him for". In an article written later he remarked that releasing the single on Halloween day was "a bit of an odd choice for such an uplifting song as this". Phil Scilippa of EDM.com noted that the song "retains an optimistic vibe, while the lyrics themselves are quite nostalgic and sad". He called the single "a future bass inspired sound" endowed with "an uplifting vivacity" thanks to "Lewis' piano parts and vocals" which "are the cherry on top" and giving to the song "a bright and summery feeling".

Music video 
The official music video of the song was released at the same day through Martin Garrix's YouTube channel. It shows Lewis with his piano, while Garrix plays the guitar.

Track listing

Credits and personnel 
Credits adapted from Tidal.

 Martin Garrix  – production, composition, lyrics, guitar, master engineering, mix engineering
 Albin Nedler – co-production, composition, lyrics, backing vocals
 Dean Lewis – lead vocals, composition, lyrics, guitar
 Kristoffer Fogelmark – composition, lyrics
 Eelco Bakker – drums
 Tom Myers – drums
 Alex Bennison – guitar
 Rob Bekhuis – vocal engineering
 Frank van Essen – strings, string arrangement

Charts

Weekly charts

Year-end charts

Certifications

References

External links 
 

2019 singles
2019 songs
Martin Garrix songs
Dean Lewis songs
Future bass songs
Songs written by Martin Garrix
Songs written by Dean Lewis
Songs written by Kristoffer Fogelmark
Stmpd Rcrds singles
Songs written by Albin Nedler